Manar Dam, is an earthfill dam on the Manar River at village Warwant near Barul Tal.Kandhar, Nanded district in the state of Maharashtra in India.

Manar Project is situated at village Barul which is, 51.92 km. (32 miles) distant from the district headquarters. An approach road of 25.76 km (16 miles) in length has been constructed from Soankhed on Nanded-Latur road connecting the dam site.

The earthen dam has been put across the Manar. The maximum height of the dam is 26.84 metres, (88') and the length is 1,859.28 metres (6,100').

The left bank canal is 72.420 km (45 miles) in length with carrying capacity of 590 cusecs. The right bank canal, with a carrying capacity of 42 cusecs is, 19.312 km (12 miles) in length. The waste weir on the right bank has a total length of 731.52 metres (2,400'). The project will facilitate irrigation of 26,708.88 hectares (66,000 acres) of land. The construction work was started in 1960 and was scheduled to be completed in two phases by the end of the Third Five-Year Plan at an estimated cost of Rs. 5,26,69,400.

Specifications

Purpose
 Irrigation
 Small scale fishing

See also
 Dams in Maharashtra
 List of reservoirs and dams in India

References

Dams in Nanded district
Dams completed in 1968
1968 establishments in Maharashtra